Mordellistena fenderi is a beetle in the genus Mordellistena of the family Mordellidae. It was described in 1947 by Ray.

References

fenderi
Beetles described in 1947